"Se Parecía Tanto a Ti" ("She Seems So Much Like You") is a song performed by American salsa singer Johnny Rivera on his studio album Déjame Intentarlo (1995). It was written by Ricardo Vizuete and released as the lead single from the album. José A. Estévez, Jr. of AllMusic listed as one of the album's highlights. The track was recognized as one of the best-performing songs of the year at the 1996 ASCAP Latin Awards. It became his first (and to date only) number-one song on the Tropical Airplay chart.

Charts

Weekly charts

Year-end charts

See also
List of Billboard Tropical Airplay number ones of 1994 and 1995

References

1995 songs
1995 singles
Johnny Rivera songs
RMM Records singles